Ramiro Rampinelli, born Lodovico Rampinelli (1697 – 1759), was an Italian mathematician and physicist. He was a monk in the Olivetan Order. He had a decisive influence on the spread of mathematical analysis, algebra and mathematical physics in the best universities of Italy. He is one of the best known Italian scholars in the field of infinitesimal mathematics of the first half of the 18th century.

Biography
He was born in Brescia into the noble Rampinelli family and educated by the Jesuits; he learned the rudiments of mathematics from Giovan Battista Mazini.

He studied first at the University of Bologna, where he was a disciple of Gabriele Manfredi, and took his monastic vows on 1 November 1722 at San Michele in Bosco.

In 1727, after a brief stay at the Monastery of St. Helen in Venice, he entered the Abbey of St. Benedict in Padua, where he made the acquaintance of the best known professors of mathematics at the University of Padua, such as Marquess Giovanni Poleni and Count Jacopo Riccati; he formed a lasting friendship with the latter's family.

In 1731 he was in Rome for a year, spending time with Celestino Galiani and Antonio Leprotti, studying subjects including architecture.

After a period at the University of Naples Federico II, during which time he was always in contact with the best mathematicians, such as Nicola Antonio De Martino, he was assigned by his superiors to the University of Pavia for a year. He then returned to the University of Bologna in 1733, to teach mathematics. Here he completed his Istituzioni Fisiche con il metodo analitico.

In 1740, after a stay at the monastery of St. Francis in Brescia, he transferred to the Olivetan monastery of San Vittore al Corso in Milan, where he was also mathematics tutor to the noblewoman Maria Gaetana Agnesi, who remembered him with gratitude in the preface to her Instituzioni Analitiche per la gioventù d'Italia.

In 1747, the Senate of Milan appointed him (at double salary) to the chair in Mathematics and Physics at the University of Pavia. His expertise in river hydraulics also earned him the appointment as supervisor both for the construction of the Pavia-Milan canal and for the construction of the embankment to contain the Po River at Parpanese, in the Oltrepò Pavese.

In 1758 his Lectiones opticæ Ramiri Rampinelii brixiani Congregationis Montis Oliveti monachi et in gymnasio Ticinensi Matheseos Professoris was published with the prestigious Brescia printer Bossini. This work on optics was to have been followed by Trigonometria and Applicazione dei principi matematici alla fisica pratica, but Rampinelli suffered a stroke on 10 April 1758.

After a short period of recuperation in Brescia, he returned to the monastery of San Vittore al Corso in Milan, where, on 8 February 1759, he had a second stroke and died.

Giordano Riccati wrote in a supplement to his eulogy dated 9 January 1760:
In him were united doctrine and an indescribable modesty, and firm religious faith accompanied by all the moral and Christian virtues. His only thoughts were ever to fulfill the obligations of his own condition, and study his only innocent passion, by which he let himself be dominated, virtuously directing it outward in indefatigable service of his Religion and the Public. He dedicated himself willingly to others' benefit, and of benefits received, an indelible, grateful memory was preserved.

Works

 

Other works by Rampinelli, said by contemporaries to be preserved in manuscript at the monastery of San Vittore in Milan, are now lost.
 Applicazione de' principi alla fisica pratica 
 Trattato di trigonometria piana e sferica
 Istituzioni Fisiche con il metodo analitico
 Trattato di idrostatica (ad integrazione delle istituzioni fisiche)

References

Sources and further reading
 Excerpta Totius Italiae necnon Helvetia littératoria Vol. III - 1759
 C. G. Pozzi. "Elogio del P.D. Ramiro Rampinelli Bresciano". Giornale de' Letterati, Rome, 1760
 F. Torricelli. "De Vita Rampinelli Epistola". in Lectiones Opticae. Brescia, 1760
 A. Fabroni. Vitae Italorum doctrina excellentium. Vol. VIII. Pisa, 1781
 F. Mandelli. Nuova raccolta di opuscoli scientifici e filosofici. Ed. A. Calogerà. Vol. XL. Venice, 1784
 A. Brognoli. Elogi de' Bresciani per dottrina eccellenti nel secolo XVIII. Brescia, 1785
 P. Verri. Memorie appartenenti alla vita ed agli studi di P. Frisi. Milan, 1787
 A. F. Frisi. Elogio storico di Donna M. G. Agnesi Milanese. Milan: Galeazzi, 1799
 V. Peroni. Biblioteca Bresciana. Vol. III. Brescia, 1821
 P. Gambara. Ragionamenti di cose patrie. Vol. IV. Brescia, 1840
 J. C. Poggendorf. Biographisch-literarisches Handwörterbuch zur Geschichte der exakten Wissenschaften. Vol. II. Leipzig, 1863
 C. Cocchetti. Del movimento intellettuale nella provincia di Brescia. Brescia, 1880
 U. Baldini. "L'insegnamento fisico matematico a Pavia alle soglie dell'età Teresiana". In Economia, istituzioni, cultura in Lombardia nell'età di M. Teresa. Vol. III. Milan: Il Mulino, 1980

Italian mathematicians
University of Bologna alumni
Academic staff of the University of Bologna
Academic staff of the University of Pavia
1697 births
1759 deaths
Scientists from Brescia